Phunphin is a district (amphoe) in Surat Thani province in the south of Thailand. Tha Kham is the principal town of the district. In 2014, the population was 73,067.

Geography
Neighboring districts are (from north clockwise): Tha Chang, Bandon, Ban Na Doem, Khian Sa, Khiri Rat Nikhom, and Vibhavadi. It has a short coastline on Bandon Bay to the northeast.

The main rivers of the district are the Tapi and its tributary Phum Duang, which flows into the Tapi at the town of Tha Kham.

History
The district's name was changed from Tha Kham to Phunphin in 1939.

Administration

Central administration 
Phunphin district is divided into 16 sub-districts (tambons), which are further subdivided into 98 administrative villages (mubans).

Local administration 
There is one town (thesaban mueang) in the district:
 Tha Kham consisting of parts of sub-district Tha Kham.

There are 16 sub-district administrative organizations (SAO) in the district:
 Tha Kham consisting of parts of sub-district Tha Kham.
 Tha Sathon consisting of sub-district Tha Sathon.
 Lilet consisting of sub-district Lilet.
 Bang Maduea consisting of sub-district Bang Maduea.
 Bang Duean consisting of sub-district Bang Duean.
 Tha Rong Chang consisting of sub-district Tha Rong Chang.
 Krut consisting of sub-district Krut.
 Phunphin consisting of sub-district Phunphin.
 Bang Ngon consisting of sub-district Bang Ngon.
 Si Wichai consisting of sub-district Si Wichai.
 Nam Rop consisting of sub-district Nam Rop.
 Maluan consisting of sub-district Maluan.
 Hua Toei consisting of sub-district Hua Toei.
 Nong Sai consisting of sub-district Nong Sai.
 Khao Hua Khwai consisting of sub-district Khao Hua Khwai.
 Tapan consisting of sub-district Tapan.

Transport 
Phunphin is the transportation hub of Surat Thani Province. It has one railway intersection, three railway stations, and four rail stops. Surat Thani Railway Station in this district is the main passenger railway station of Surat Thani Province. At the Ban Thung Pho junction (km631) the southern railway branches to what was originally intended to connect the railway to  Takua Thung district, Phang Nga, just north of Phuket province. After the completion of 31 km of the railroad to Khiri Ratthanikhom in 1956, construction was halted for budgetary reasons.

Also in Phunphin are the Surat Thani Airport, the Inland Container Depot (ICD), and the Asian highway AH2 (Thai Hwy 41), the main road connecting to other provinces. Thai Hwy 401 connects Phunphin with the town of Surat Thani.

References

External links 

amphoe.com (Thai)

Districts of Surat Thani province